Lai da Curnera is a reservoir on the river Rein da Curnera in the municipality of Tujetsch, in the Grisons, Switzerland. The reservoir is linked to Lai da Sontga Maria and Lai da Nalps in the neighboring valley.

All surrounding rivers are diverted into the reservoir, among them the Rein da Tuma, coming from Lai da Tuma (Tomasee), near the Oberalp Pass and known as the source of the river Rhine. The Vorderrhein, or Anterior Rhine as the Rhine is called in this area, passes just about 2 kilometers north to the barrier of the lake. A multiday trekking route is signposted along the young Rhine called Senda Sursilvana, from where the barrier can be spotted easily.

See also
List of lakes of Switzerland
List of mountain lakes of Switzerland

References

External links

Cunera
Cunera
RLaidaCurnera
Tujetsch